Class 37 may refer to:

British Rail Class 37, a British diesel locomotive
BHP Newcastle 37 class, a class of Australian diesel locomotives
LT&SR 37 Class, a class of British tank locomotives
 DRG Class 37, a class of German steam locomotives with 2-6-0 wheel arrangements operated by the Deutsche Reichsbahn: 
 Class 37.0-1: Prussian P 6
 Class 37.1-2: PKP Class Oi1
 Class 37.2: LBE G 6
 Class 37.3: ČSD Class 344.0
 Class 37.4: PKP Class  Oi101